The 2011–12 North Texas Mean Green men's basketball team represented the University of North Texas during the 2011–12 NCAA Division I men's basketball season. The Mean Green, led by 11th year head coach Johnny Jones, played their home games at UNT Coliseum, nicknamed The Super Pit,  and are members of the West Division of the Sun Belt Conference. They finished the season 18–14, 9–7 in Sun Belt play to finish in fourth place in the West Division. They advanced to the championship game of the Sun Belt Basketball tournament for the third consecutive year before falling to WKU. They did not accept an invitation to a post season tournament.

Roster

Schedule
 
|-
!colspan=9| Exhibition

|-
!colspan=9| Regular season

|-
!colspan=9| 2012 Sun Belt Conference men's basketball tournament

References

North Texas Mean Green men's basketball seasons
North Texas
North Texas Mean Green men's basketball team
North Texas Mean Green men's basketball team